MŽRKL League for the season 2011–12 was the eleventh season of the WABA League. The study included ten teams from four countries, a champion for the first time in team history became the Partizan Galenika.  In this season participating clubs from Serbia, Montenegro, Bosnia and Herzegovina and from Slovenia.

MŽRKL for season 2011–12 began on 8 October 2011 and ended on 1 March 2012, when he it was completed a Regular season. Final Four to be played from 3–4 March 2012 in Zenica in Bosnia and Herzegovina. Winner Final Four this season for the team Partizan Galenika from Serbia.

Team information

Regular season
The League of the season was played with 10 teams and play a dual circuit system, each with each one game at home and away. The four best teams at the end of the regular season were placed in the Final Four. The regular season began on 8 October 2011 and it will end on 1 March 2012.

Final four
Final Four to be played from 3–4 March 2012. in the Arena Zenica in Zenica, Bosnia and Herzegovina.

Awards

Player of the Year: Tamara Radočaj (170-PG-87) of Partizan Galenika 
Guard of the Year: Tamara Radočaj (170-PG-87) of Partizan Galenika 
Forward of the Year: Tina Trebec (189-F-90) of Athlete Celje 
Center of the Year: Anna Tolikova (190-C-86) of Čelik Zenica 
Defensive Player of the Year: Dragana Stanković (188-F-95) of Sloboda Novi Grad 
Coach of the Year: Marina Maljković of Partizan Galenika 

1st Team
PG: Tamara Radočaj (170-87) of Partizan Galenika 
G: Saša Čađo (178-89) of Hemofarm Štada 
F: Tina Trebec (189-90) of Athlete Celje 
C: Nataša Popović (194-82) of Budućnost Podgorica 
C: Anna Tolikova (190-86) of Čelik Zenica 

2nd Team
PG: Milica Dabović (175-82) of Partizan Galenika 
G: Biljana Stanković (176-74) of Hemofarm Štada 
F: Alicia Gladden (178-85) of Partizan Galenika 
F: Dragana Stanković (188-95) of Sloboda Novi Grad 
C: Ivona Bogoje (193-76) of Mladi Krajišnik 

Honorable Mention
Milica Deura (178-G-90) of Mladi Krajišnik 
Jasmina Bigović (174-G-79) of Budućnost Podgorica 
Zvjezdana Gagić (169-G-81) of Sloboda Novi Grad 
Teja Oblak (171-G-90) of Athlete Celje 
Josipa Bura (185-C-85) of Čelik Zenica 
Nevena Jovanović (179-G-90) of Radivoj Korać 
Biljana Stjepanović (189-C-87) of Radivoj Korać 
Nikolina Popović (184-G/F-84) of Budućnost Podgorica 
Tijana Ajduković (197-C-91) of Hemofarm Štada

External links
 2011–12 MŽRKL at eurobasket.com
 2011–12 MŽRKL at srbijasport.net

2011-12
2011–12 in European women's basketball leagues
2011–12 in Serbian basketball
2011–12 in Bosnia and Herzegovina basketball
2011–12 in Slovenian basketball
2011–12 in Montenegrin basketball